Saulius Kleiza (born April 2, 1964 in Kaunas) is a retired shot putter and discus thrower from Lithuania, who competed for his native country at two consecutive Summer Olympics, starting in 1996. His personal best in the shot put event is 20.91 metres, thrown on 13 May 1987 in Leselidze.

Achievements

References
sports-reference
 IAAF Profile

1964 births
Living people
Lithuanian male shot putters
Lithuanian male discus throwers
Athletes (track and field) at the 1996 Summer Olympics
Athletes (track and field) at the 2000 Summer Olympics
Olympic athletes of Lithuania
Sportspeople from Kaunas
World Athletics Championships athletes for Lithuania
Competitors at the 1994 Goodwill Games